Horton Heath is a small village in Dorset, England situated one mile from Three Legged Cross and two miles from Horton. It consists of a main road, with Slough Lane and an unnamed road as the only two paved roads coming off it. There are several farms.

External links

Villages in Dorset